The following is a list of George Washington Colonials men's basketball head coaches. There have been 29 head coaches of the Colonials in their 109-season history.

George Washington's current head coach is Chris Caputo. He was hired as the Colonials' head coach in April 2022, replacing Jamion Christian, who was fired after the 2021–22 season.

References

George Washington

George Washington Colonials men's basketball coaches